Tre Nagella is an American recording engineer, mixer, and record producer.  He has won three Grammy Awards and has worked with artists, Kirk Franklin, Ed Sheeran, Blake Shelton, Lady Gaga, Travis Scott, Brandy, and Monica (singer), among others. He is the co-owner of Luminous Sound Studios in Dallas, Texas.

Career
Tre Nagella started playing guitar in his teens and was involved with his High School's technical theater department, running the audio for the orchestra, choir, jazz band, musicals, and dance concerts. After graduating from High School, he attended Full Sail Center for the Recording Arts where he won four Directors Awards and was the Valedictorian of his class.

Nagella had a long working relationship with gospel artist Kirk Franklin, winning three Grammy Awards for engineering his albums, Losing My Religion, Hello Fear, and The Fight of My Life. He has also engineered and mixed many of the albums for Franklin's record label including The Walls Group’s Grammy-nominated album, Fast Forward.

He has engineered and mixed albums for artists Ed Sheeran, Travis Scott, Lady Gaga, Blake Shelton, Christina Aguilera, Pimp C, Monica, Alan Parsons, Ledisi, Tamela Mann and others. He co-produced Kitt Wakeley's Symphony of Sinners & Saints album which peaked at #1 on Billboard's Classical Crossover and Classical charts. He has written and  produced music used in advertising campaigns for Apple, Samsung, Ford Motor Company and Smirnoff Vodka, among others.

Nagella, along with choral group Verdigris Ensemble and technology company Async Art, created the first programmable music NFT (non-fungible tokens) called Betty's Notebook, a 21-minute programmable piece of music.

Nagella has been a panel and guest speaker at SXSW, The Recording Academy, Full Sail Center for the Recording Arts, The Fine Arts Department at CFBISD (Carrollton-Farmers Branch Independent School District), and the Recording Connection,  among others. The Fine Arts Department at CFBISD (Carrollton-Farmers Branch Independent School District) inducted him into the Hall of Fame at the CFBISD Fine Arts State and National Awards Ceremony in 2022.

Awards

Selected discography

References

Grammy Award winners
Record producers from Texas
Year of birth missing (living people)
Living people